The Tampa Bay Buccaneers are an American football franchise based in Tampa, Florida. The Buccaneers are members of the South division in the National Football Conference (NFC) of the National Football League (NFL). The list documents the season-by-season records of the Tampa Bay Buccaneers' franchise from 1976 to present, including postseason records, and league awards for individual players or head coaches.

The Buccaneers first joined the NFL in 1976 as members of the AFC West. The following year, they moved to the NFC Central. The Tampa Bay expansion franchise was originally awarded to Tom McCloskey, a construction company owner from Philadelphia. It soon became apparent that McCloskey had financial problems, so the NFL found a replacement in Hugh Culverhouse. They were purchased by Malcolm Glazer in 1995 for $192 million, following Culverhouse's death. The front office staff of the team includes Bryan Glazer, Edward Glazer, and Joel Glazer.

The Buccaneers have won two Super Bowl championships as a franchise, first in Super Bowl XXXVII during the 2002 season and again in Super Bowl LV during the 2020 season. The Buccaneers are one of two NFL franchises to have at least two Super Bowl appearances without a loss, along with the Baltimore Ravens. The Buccaneers have been divisional champions seven times, three of them in the NFC Central and four in the NFC South. They were the first team to win the NFC South after the NFL realigned the divisions in 2002. In their 46-year history, the Buccaneers have played over 700 regular-season and post-season games and have appeared in the post-season twelve times.

Seasons

Footnotes

See also
 History of the Tampa Bay Buccaneers

References

 
 
 
 
 

Tampa Bay Buccaneers
 
seasons